Helen Herz Cohen (1912 – March 23, 2006) was the Director of Camp Walden, an all-girls residential summer camp located in Denmark, Maine. She founded The Main Idea, an annual nonprofit camp for economically disadvantaged girls.

Biography
Helen Herz Cohen was the niece of one of the founders of Camp Walden, and spent many summers working there as a camp counselor and then head counselor. She became the Director in 1938, at the age of 26. She later became the owner of Camp Walden and remained its Director until 1995.

Helen Herz Cohen died on March 23, 2006.  She was 93 years old.  Her husband, Edwin S. Cohen, tax expert and former Assistant Treasury Secretary for Tax Policy during the Nixon Administration, had died in earlier that year in January.  The Cohens were survived by their two sons, Edwin C. of Manhattan and Roger of Denmark, Maine; their daughter, Wendy S. Cohen of Charlottesville, Virginia; and their two grandchildren.

Awards and honors

The Maine Youth Camping Association presented Helen Herz Cohen with the Halsey Gulick Award in 1991.  She received many other awards and honors throughout her lifetime and was even interviewed by Barbara Walters on national television.

Camp Walden

Camp Walden was founded in 1916, shortly after the first Girl Scout camp and Camp Fire Girls camps began, at the very end of the Progressive Era in the United States.  American summer camps were part of a trend in the country to return to nature, which included the rise of the national park system, the growth of urban parks, and the spread of the American suburbs.

Helen Herz Cohen's camping philosophy encouraged confidence, feelings of self-worth, and independence in the decades of campers that attended under her leadership.  Affectionately referred to as "Miss Herz" and "HHC" by Waldenites throughout the years, she built a deeply connected alumnae group through her strong influence.  She maintained contact with Walden alumnae for decades, often acting as a role model to former Walden campers.  Miss Herz taught her Waldenites that all females have opportunities for education and leadership.  She believed that an all-girls camp "helps you develop confidence in making decisions."

Still today, Waldenites (as Camp Walden alumnae are known) often recall the profound influence Miss Herz had on them.  One former camper wrote, "I thank you for sharing your wonderful Walden with me--then and now--for it still remains the one place I want to be when summer comes."  After receiving a touching gift from Miss Herz, another Waldenite wrote:

The Main Idea

Helen Herz Cohen founded The Main Idea at Camp Walden in 1968.  The Main Idea is a nonprofit camp for economically disadvantaged girls.  Camp Walden hosts the Main Idea on its property for ten days in August every year, at the close of the regular camping season.  Every Main Idea camper attends for free.  The Main Idea's budget is funded primarily through private donations from Camp Walden campers and alumnae.

Miss Herz's goal in establishing The Main Idea was "to try to give [the campers] a new window in life, see something different, inspire them to do something with their lives."

World War II

References

External links
 Camp Walden
 The Main Idea

1912 births
2006 deaths
Outdoor educators